Khersonsky is a rural locality (a khutor) in Novopostoyalovskoye Rural Settlement, Rossoshansky District, Voronezh Oblast, Russia. The population was 115 as of 2010. There are 2 streets.

Geography 
Khersonsky is located 5 km northeast of Rossosh (the district's administrative centre) by road. Sobachy is the nearest rural locality.

References 

Rural localities in Rossoshansky District